The 2022–23 Alabama Crimson Tide men's basketball team represents the University of Alabama in the 2022–23 NCAA Division I men's basketball season. The team is led by fourth-year head coach Nate Oats. They played their home games at Coleman Coliseum in Tuscaloosa, Alabama as a member of the Southeastern Conference.

On March 11, 2023, Alabama won their program-record 28th game of the year as they defeated Missouri in the SEC Tournament, 72–61.

Previous season
The Crimson Tide ended the 2021–22 season 19–14, 9–9 in SEC Play to finish a five-way tie for 5th place. They lost in the Second Round of the SEC tournament to Vanderbilt. They received an at-large bid to the NCAA tournament as the No. 6 seed in the West Region, where they were upset in the First Round by Notre Dame.

Offseason

Departures

Incoming transfers

2022 recruiting class

2023 recruiting class

Preseason

SEC media poll
The SEC media poll was released on October 19, 2022.

Roster

 
 

 

On Dec. 28, 2022, Alabama coach Nate Oats said Darius Miles was away from the team “with a personal matter.”
On Jan. 15, 2023, Miles among 2 charged with capital murder in shooting death on the Strip early Sunday morning and he is no longer active in the roster.

Schedule and results

|-
!colspan=12 style=""|Exhibition

|-
!colspan=12 style=""|Regular Season

|-
!colspan=12 style=""|  SEC tournament

|-
!colspan=12 style=|NCAA tournament

Rankings

*AP does not release post-NCAA Tournament rankings.

See also
2022–23 Alabama Crimson Tide women's basketball team

References    

Alabama
Alabama Crimson Tide men's basketball seasons
Alabama
Alabama Crimson Tide
Alabama Crimson Tide